Streptoalloteichus tenebrarius is a bacterium that biosynthesizes the aminoglycoside antibiotics tobramycin and apramycin.

References

Streptomyces